DeForest and deforestation (and variant spellings) may refer to:

Deforestation
DeForest (name), includes a list of people with the name
Deforestation (computer science), a program transformation
DeForest Training School or DeVry University,  private, for-profit university system in the United States
Lake DeForest, reservoir in Clarkstown, New York
DeForest, Wisconsin, village in Dane County, Wisconsin, United States along the Yahara River
DeForest High School, Wisconsin
De Forest (crater), Lunar impact crater on the far side of the Moon

See also
 De Forest (disambiguation)